Jesper Skaaning (a.k.a. Acustic) is a Danish electronic musician, producer and film composer.
He started his career as a guitarist in various experimental punk bands in the early 1980s and was inspired by European electropop and early electronic Music, especially by Kraftwerk. At that time he formed a band, Acustisk Ungdom, from which he later took his name.

He formed the Future 3 electronic trio together with Anders Remmer (a.k.a. Dub Tractor) and Thomas Knak (a.k.a. Opiate) in 1994.
He is also a member of People Press Play (which is Future 3 plus Sara Savery) and has a duo project with Remmer,
Jesper & Anders a.k.a. Recycler 202.

With his sense of harmony, and his consciously minimalist approach, Skaaning constructs a sound which is forthcoming without trying too hard to please.

At the moment Jesper is working together with guitar and bassplayer Djon on the side project Spring, which is a return to more guitar oriented material with discrete use of vocals.

Discography 
 Tease (12”) - (Flex Records, 1995)
 No 1 (CD, Album) - (April Records, 1996)
 No 2 (12”) - (April Records, 1997)
 Star Quality (CD) - (April Records, 1998)
 Split (12") (with Goodiepal) - (Hobby Industries, 2000)
 Split (12”) (with RJ Valeo) - (Hobby Industries, 2002)
 Welcome (CD)- (Rump Recordings, 2005)

References

External links 

Jesper Skaaning at Discogs
Welcome album review
Acustic at MySpace

Living people
Danish electronic musicians
Intelligent dance musicians
Year of birth missing (living people)